The Most Wonderful Time of the Year is the third and final solo album from former Stone Temple Pilots and Velvet Revolver lead singer Scott Weiland. It features his versions of traditional Christmas songs. A deluxe edition of the album was released on November 4, 2022.

Promotion
Milwaukee radio station WLUM-FM 102.1 produced "A Very Scott Weiland Christmas," in which they played the album repeatedly for 24 hours starting Christmas Eve and ending on Christmas Day.

Track listing

References

2011 Christmas albums
Scott Weiland albums
Atco Records albums
Softdrive Records albums
Christmas albums by American artists